Croatian Peruvians are Peruvians of Croatian descent.  Mostly settled in the Peruvian capital, Lima, Croatian-Peruvians have scattered throughout the vast metropolis, but are known to have established a strong community in the Miraflores District, where strong ties to the ethnic group still remain. Due to intermarriage, most Croatian-Peruvians are of mixed ancestry. Actual conversations in Croatian are common only within first generation immigrants. Although Croatian speech in Peru has been generally lost. 

Most Croatian-Peruvians are Roman Catholic and either completely Croat or of mixed European origin. Included are Istro-Romanians, who became adjusted to Peruvian society because of the linguistic similarities between Istro-Romanian and Spanish, as well as Latin identity of Istro-Romanians.

History
Peru was the first South American country to receive immigrants from Croatia. Early settlers came from the Republic of Ragusa (modern-day Dubrovnik) in the 16th century. A more significant number of immigrants arrived in the second half of the 19th century and the early 20th century, mostly from the Dubrovnik area and the rest of the Croatian Adriatic coast. Some Croats were involved in the guano business that was flourishing in the late 19th century; others pursued copper, gold and silver mining in the Andes. By the end of the 19th century, Croats were the most prominent foreign community in the mining town of Cerro de Pasco.

Once again, a heavy wave of Croatian immigration took place once World War II began. This time, however, an estimate of 352 Croatians are recorded to have arrived in Lima. Many settled in the populous Miraflores district and cultural assimilation was smooth due to similarities in religion and cooperation of the native residents. Immigrant bachelors often married the local women and settled in Lima. Few are known to have left Peru to go back to either Croatia or other countries.

A group of approximately 1,000 political emigrants from Croatia arrived in the country in 1948. The new generation of immigrants differed significantly from the old one, and the two populations remained separate for a long time.

Today the Croatian government estimates 6,000 Peruvians are of Croatian origin and most are Peruvian-born; few of the actual immigrants still remain alive.

Croatian-Peruvians today
Croatian-Peruvians are not a widely known ethnic group in Peru, nonetheless their contributions are noted in everyday life.  Most popular among these is the sport of bocce, bochas in English and Spanish, a simple ball game known all over Europe and very popular in Croatia. Gatherings in the affluent Regatas Lima country club in the Limenian district of Chorrillos became common after bocha alleys were constructed there, and soon all over the city. Bochas is now a renowned sport for Croatians and non-Croatians alike all over Peru.

Many Croatian-Peruvians had humble beginnings in Peru, but have progressed greatly from then. Many became renowned in Peru's already successful fishing industry and others were able to obtain steady jobs in other trades. Croatian cuisine had relative fame in Lima and several Croatian-Peruvians opened their own restaurants, which served mostly seafood.

Notable Croatian Peruvians 
Cesar Bielich-Pomareda, Minister of the Navy of Peru
Ismael Bielich-Flores, politician
Ivan Bulos footballer
Laura Spoya, TV host, Miss Peru 2015
Juan Bielovucic Cavalié, aviator
Juan Gargurevich, journalist
Saby Kamalich, actress
Kristian Kreković, painter
Sofía Mulánovich, surfer
Raul Ruidiaz, football player
Renzo Sheput, footballer
Vanessa Terkes, actress
Guillermo Tomasevich, footballer
Esteban Pavletich Trujillo, novelist, essayist

See also
 Croats
 List of Croats

References

External links
 Asociación Croata

Peru